General Sir Hector Munro, 8th Laird of Novar, KB (1726 – 27 December 1805) was a Scottish army officer and politician who served as the ninth Commander-in-Chief of Bengal from 1764 to 1765.

Early military career in Scotland

He was the son of Hugh Munro, 7th laird of Novar, in Ross, Scotland. His family also had a home at Clayside in Golspie, Sutherland, which was then a collection of cottages and not the formed town that it later became. He served in the Golspie militia which fought on the Government side at the Battle of Littleferry on 15 April 1746 in Sutherland where the Jacobites were defeated. He entered the regular army at an early age, probably in the 64th (Loudon's Highlanders) Regiment of Foot in 1747.

Hector is said to have got his first commission in the army after helping the Duchess of Gordon who was travelling alone in Sutherland.  Hector took over from a drunken coachman and brought her to safety. The Duchess later used her influence to procure him a Lieutenant's commission in the 34th (Cumberland) Regiment of Foot.

Hector's family home was at Novar House. Early maps call it 'Tenuer' (Scottish Gaelic: Tigh 'n fhuamhair, house of the giant).

Apprehension of Jacobite rebels

In 1753, or 1754, Hector Munro was ordered to Badenoch with three squadrons of Dragoons to apprehend certain rebels in that district, with special instructions to apprehend John Du Cameron, better known as "Sergent Mòr". Hector Munro captured Cameron after he was betrayed by a local farmer. John Cameron was soon afterwards executed in Perth.

Hector Munro was also tasked with capturing Ewen MacPherson of Cluny, who took part in the Jacobite rising of 1745. However, Macpherson evaded Munro's grasp and escaped to France. Macpherson tradition is that one day Munro, with a large party of soldiers, surrounded Macpherson's house.  With no means of escape, Macpherson dressed himself as a footman or groom, came forward and held Lieutenant Munro's horse while Munro searched his house for him. On return Munro is said to have handed the groom a shilling and then rode off. Another version of the story, however, is that Munro of Novar actually knew Macpherson quite well and winked at him as he threw him the grooms fee.

In 1759 he was appointed major in the newly raised 89th (Highland) Regiment of Foot.

War in India

In December 1760, The 89th regiment embarked at Portsmouth for the East Indies, and arrived at Bombay in November following. The Duke of Gordon was desirous of accompanying the regiment, but, at the request of his mother, George II of Great Britain induced him to remain at home to finish his education by telling him that, "there being only nine dukes in the Kingdom of Scotland", he could not be spared.

The 89th had no particular station assigned to it, but kept moving from place to place until a strong detachment under Major Hector Munro joined the army under the command of Major John Carnac, in the neighbourhood of Patna. Major Munro then assumed the command, and being well supported by his men, quelled a formidable mutiny among the troops. After 20 Sepoys had been executed by Major Munro by blowing them off guns, and with discipline restored, he attacked the enemy at Buxar, on 23 October 1764 in what became the Battle of Buxar. Though the force opposed to him was five times as numerous as his own, he overthrew and dispersed it. According to historian John William Fortescue, the Mughal troops had 2000 men killed, and left 133 pieces of cannon on the field; whilst Munro's troops had 289 killed, 499 wounded and 85 missing.

Major Munro received a letter of thanks on the occasion from the President and Council of Calcutta. "The signal victory you gained", they say, "so as at one blow utterly to defeat the designs of the enemy against these provinces, is an event which does so much honour to yourself, Sir, in particular, and to all the officers and men under your command, and which, at the same time, is attended with such particular advantages to the Company, as call upon us to return you our sincere thanks." For this important service Major Munro was immediately promoted to the brevet rank of lieutenant colonel.

Member of Parliament 

In 1768, Returning home, he was elected as Member of Parliament for the Inverness Burghs, which he continued to represent for over thirty years, though much of this period was spent in India. He was one of the shareholders of the failed Ayr Bank of Douglas, Heron and Company which collapsed in the financial crisis of 1772. The resultant financial embarrassment may be why in 1778 he returned to take command of the East India Company's Madras Army.

Return to India 

Later in 1778 Munro took Pondichéry from the French, but in 1780 in the Second Anglo-Mysore War the defeat of a British force by Hyder Ali at the Battle of Perambakam near Conjeeveram forced him to fall back on St. Thomas Mount. There, Sir Eyre Coote took command of the army, and in 1781 won a major victory against Hyder Ali at Porto Novo (Parangipettai), where Munro was in command of the right division. Negapatam was taken by Munro in November of the same year; and in 1782 he retired to Scotland.

In 1782, the Fyrish Monument was ordered built by Munro in Fyrish, near Evanton, Easter Ross, Scotland. He did this to provide work for the local unemployed population.

In 1787, he was given the colonelcy of the 42nd (Royal Highland) Regiment of Foot, a position he held until his death in 1805.

Family

Sir Hector Munro, 8th laird of Novar having reached the full rank of General finally retired in 1798. He died unmarried on or about 27 December 1805 at Novar House. He had four natural children by different mothers:

Hector Sutherland Munro, born 10 July 1775 (but baptised and indexed in error only as Hector Sutherland). He joined the East India Company's military service as a cadet in 1792, but on his way to Madras was mauled by a tiger on Saugor Island, Bengal on 21 December 1792 and died the following day. The incident was widely publicised in the British press and the story has been retold many times. It has also been also commemorated in a series of Staffordshire figures of the "Death of Munrow". Mackenzie erroneously identified the victim as his half-brother Hugh (below)
Hugh Munro born 22 March 1777, who joined the East India Company as a Writer in 1796, and rose to be a Senior Merchant, Collector and Mintmaster of Bombay. His father, who held the post of Barrack Master of North Britain, appears to have appointed him Deputy. He died in 1814, aboard the Henry Addington, on the journey home from India via China. 
Alexander Munro, baptised 26 July 1787, who also joined the East India Company as a cadet in 1803 and died, said to have been devoured by a shark, at Bombay on 12 November 1804.
Jane Munro, who married Sir Ronald Crawford Ferguson of Raith, county of Fife. She died in 1803, shortly after the birth of her second child. Her son Robert Munro-Ferguson of Raith and grandson Ronald Munro-Ferguson, 1st Viscount Novar later succeeded to the Novar estate, in accordance with the terms of the entail executed by Jane's father Sir Hector Munro.

Sir Hector Munro, 8th laird of Novar was initially succeeded by his brother, Sir Alexander Munro, 9th of Novar who was Consul-General at Madrid and then Commissioner of Customs in England. Alexander first married his cousin Margaret Munro (d. 1768) but their only son Capt. Alexander Munro was killed in India in 1778. Alexander remarried Miss Johnstone, sister of General Johnstone of Auchen Castle, Dumfries with two sons and a daughter. He was succeeded by his third son Hugh Andrew Johnstone Munro of Novar who himself left several illegitimate children including Hugh Andrew Johnstone Munro. However, as already mentioned, on the death of Hugh Andrew Johnstone Munro of Novar the estate of Novar passed to Colonel Robert Munro-Ferguson, son of Jane Munro, natural daughter of General Sir Hector Munro, 8th of Novar. The Munro-Fergusons of Novar, descendants of Robert Munro-Ferguson's daughter Alice, are still in possession of the Novar Estate today.

References

External links 
 
 Portrait of Sir Hector Munro at the Scottish National Portrait Gallery

|-

|-

1726 births
1805 deaths
People from Ross and Cromarty
Knights Companion of the Order of the Bath
British Army generals
Members of the Parliament of Great Britain for Scottish constituencies
Members of the Parliament of the United Kingdom for Scottish constituencies
Scottish soldiers
48th Regiment of Foot officers
East Surrey Regiment officers
British East India Company Army generals
Administrators in British India
Bengal Presidency
British Commanders-in-Chief of India
UK MPs 1801–1802
Hector Munro, 8th of Novar
British MPs 1768–1774
British MPs 1774–1780
British MPs 1780–1784
British MPs 1784–1790
British MPs 1790–1796
British MPs 1796–1800
British military personnel of the Second Anglo-Mysore War
British military personnel of the Fourth Anglo-Dutch War